Sir Thomas Chamberlayne, 1st Baronet (died 1643), of Wickham, Oxfordshire supported the Royalist cause in the English Civil War. He was Sheriff of Oxfordshire in 1643.

Biography
Thomas Chamberlayne was the son and heir of Sir Thomas Chamberlayne, one of the Justices of the Court of King's Bench, and his first wife Elizabeth, daughter of Sir George Fermor, of Easton Neston, Northamptonshire. He succeeded his father in September 1625.

He supported the Royalist cause and was created a baronet, on 4 February 1643. He was Sheriff of Oxfordshire in that year. He died (during his Shrievalty  and a few months after receiving his Baronetcy) on 6 October 1643. He was succeeded by his son and heir Sir Thomas Chamberlayne, 2nd Baronet.

Family
Chamberlayne married firstly, —, a daughter of —  Acland. He married secondly, Anne, daughter of Richard Chamberlatne, of Temple House, county Warwick, and of the Court of Wards.

Notes

References

1643 deaths
Year of birth unknown
High Sheriffs of Oxfordshire
Baronets in the Baronetage of England